Nicholas Zorzi may refer to:
 Nicholas Zorzi (died 1354), Marquess of Bodonitsa
 Nicholas Zorzi (died 1436), Marquess of Bodonitsa
 Nicholas II Zorzi (fl. 1410–1414), Marquess of Bodonitsa